Lectionary 260, designated by siglum ℓ 260 (in the Gregory-Aland numbering) is a Greek manuscript of the New Testament, on parchment. Palaeographically it has been not assigned to any century. Scrivener labelled it as 198e, Gregory by 83a. The manuscript has been lost.

Description 

The codex contains lessons from the Gospels lectionary (Evangelistarium).

In Mark 9:49 it reads  πας γαρ πυρι αλισθησεται – as manuscripts (א εν πυρι) B L W Δ f1 f13 28 565 700 syrs copsa.

The age of the codex is still unknown. It was never assigned on the palaeography ground.

History 

Eduard de Muralt received the collation of the codex from Odessa.

The manuscript was added to the list of New Testament manuscripts by Scrivener (number 198e) and Gregory (number 260e). Gregory did not see the manuscript.

The manuscript is sporadically cited in the critical editions of the Greek New Testament (UBS3).

Formerly the codex was housed at the State Archaeological Museum in Odessa. The present place of its housing is unknown (Jassy?). The owner of the codex is unknown.

See also 

 List of New Testament lectionaries
 Biblical manuscript
 Textual criticism
 Lectionary 259

Notes and references

Bibliography 

 

Greek New Testament lectionaries
13th-century biblical manuscripts
Lost biblical manuscripts